Lawrence "Larry" Ray Caton (born March 2, 1948 in Normal, Illinois) is an American former handball player who competed in the 1972 Summer Olympics.

In 1972 he was part of the American team which finished 14th in the Olympic tournament. He played one match.

External links
 profile

1948 births
Living people
American male handball players
Olympic handball players of the United States
Handball players at the 1972 Summer Olympics
People from Normal, Illinois